A stab vest or stab proof vest is a reinforced piece of body armor, worn under or over other items of clothing, which is designed to resist knife attacks to the chest, back and sides. Stab vests are different from bulletproof vests, most of which offer protection against firearms but afford little against stabbing with sharp-tipped objects such as knives; most stab vests afford less protection against bullets, particularly those of high caliber, but are designed to prevent serious injury by prohibiting knife penetration beyond a few millimeters. Stab vests are also needle and slash proof.

Use 
Stab proof vests are standard issue to police officers in both the United Kingdom and New Zealand. They are also commonly worn by paramedics, security staff, traffic wardens, environmental wardens, customs officers, immigration officers, bailiffs, cash in transit officers, door supervisors/bouncers, or anyone who else may be under threat.

Bulletproof vests are more commonly used by police in countries with greater firearms ownership, such as the United States and Canada; but dual-purpose armor plates that protect against both stab and firearms attacks are fairly widely available for police and also security applications.

Standards

"Ice pick" tests
In the mid-1980s the state of California Department of Corrections issued a requirement for a body armor using a commercial ice pick as the test penetrator. The test method attempted to simulate the capacity of a human attacker to deliver impact energy with their upper body. As was later shown, this test overstated the capacity of human attackers. The test used a drop mass or sabot that carried the ice pick. Using gravitational force, the height of the drop mass above the vest was proportional to the impact energy. This test specified 109 joules (81 ft·lbf) of energy and a 7.3 kg (16 lb) drop mass with a drop height of 153 cm (60 in) and an ice pick with a 4 mm (0.16 in) diameter with a sharp tip with a 5.4 m/s (17 ft/s) terminal velocity in the test. The California standard did not include knife or cutting edge weapons in the test protocol. In this early phase only titanium and steel plate offerings were successful in addressing this requirement.

These textile materials do not have equal performance with cutting-edge threats and these certifications were only with ice picks and were not tested with knives.

United Kingdom
The Police Scientific Development Branch (PSDB) work studied the type of weapons that are commonly used in stabbing attacks and the levels of impact energy fit young men are capable of generating during such an attack. The study resulted in minimum performance ratings for armour used in the UK, as defined under PSDB publication 6/99. The PSDB standard was replaced in 2007 with the current Home Office Scientific Development Branch (HOSDB) publication No. 39/07/C which governs stab resistant body armor performance in the UK. This updated standard introduced a more stringent testing procedure with more drops than the previous standard plus the introduction of the P1/B Blade which is found to be more aggressive that the older P1/A Blade.

In the UK there are no standalone ratings for spike resistance. For stab resistant armor to carry a spike resistance (SP) rating in the UK, it must first pass minimum knife resistance (KR) performance tests.

United States
In the US, the National Institute of Justice (NIJ) has established a stab-resistant body armor test standard (NIJ STD 0115.00), based on the work in the UK, which defines two threat types: spike and edged blade.

Manufacturers of body armor can voluntarily submit armor models for compliance testing through the National Law Enforcement and Corrections Technology Center in Rockville, Maryland. Through the program, manufacturers certify that their armor will defeat the specified threat at one of three threat levels. Threat levels 1, 2 and 3 are based on impact energies of 24, 33 and 43 joules respectively.

See also
 Bulletproof vest
 Brigandine

References

External links
 New Zealand Herald - Councils fight violence with stab vests
 National Institute of Justice Standard 0115.00, Stab Resistance of Personal Body Armor
 JTIC Stab-Resistant Armor
 HOSDB Body Armour Standards for UK Police (2007)Part 3: Knife and Spike Resistance
This article incorporates work from https://peosoldier.army.mil/newpeo/Equipment/Temp.asp?id=SPE_CSPBA, which is in the public domain as it is a work of the United States Military.

Body armor
Law enforcement equipment
Law enforcement uniforms